There were 14 teams participating in the 1975 Tour de France, with 10 cyclists each:

Eddy Merckx, who had won all five times that he participated, was again the big favourite. Merckx' first part of the season had been going well, winning Milan–San Remo, the Tour of Flanders and Liège–Bastogne–Liège. If Merckx would win again, he would beat Jacques Anquetil and become the first cyclist to win the Tour six times. Merckx did not care about that record: "The idea doesn't interest me very much because then people would want me to go for a seventh and then an eighth".

A few months before the race, Merckx was unsure if he would start the Tour. His race schedule had been very busy, and he thought to ride the Giro and the Tour in the same year would not work. Merckx preferred to ride the Tour, but his Italian team preferred the Giro. Bernard Thévenet contracted shingles during the 1975 Vuelta a España, but recovered and won the Dauphiné Liberé.

Start list

By team

By rider

By nationality

References

1975 Tour de France
1975